was a Japanese ceramist and businesswoman. She led the Eiraku workshop in Kyoto, becoming its fourteenth head upon the death of her husband Tokuzen; she was one of few women to head a crafts workshop in Japan. At her death she was succeeded by Shozen, a nephew of her husband; in his turn he was succeeded by her adopted son. A presentation set of coffee cups and saucers produced under Myōzen's direction was acquired by the Arthur M. Sackler Gallery in 2018. Another work, a mizusashi with bamboo in porcelain, was acquired by the Seattle Art Museum in the same year.

References

1852 births
1927 deaths
Japanese ceramists
Japanese women ceramists
20th-century Japanese women artists
20th-century ceramists
20th-century Japanese businesswomen
20th-century Japanese businesspeople
19th-century Japanese women